That's Why is the fifth studio album released by American country music artist Craig Morgan. It was released on October 21, 2008, as his first album for BNA Records (see 2008 in country music) after his exiting Broken Bow Records earlier that same year. As with his first two Broken Bow albums — 2003's I Love It and 2005's My Kind of Livin' — Morgan co-produced the album with Phil O'Donnell. They co-wrote the lead-off single "Love Remembers", which became Morgan's sixth Top Ten hit on the Hot Country Songs charts in November 2008. Following this song was "God Must Really Love Me", which became his first single to miss the Top 20 since "Look At Us", which peaked at number 27 in 2004. A May 21, 2009, reissue replaced two songs with new songs, including "Bonfire", which was released that month as the third single. As of September 18, 2010, the album has sold 60,868 copies in the U.S.

Content
On May 26, 2009, That's Why was re-issued with the new tracks "Bonfire" and "This Ain't Nothin'", which replaced "Every Red Light" and "Summer Sundown." Morgan wrote "Bonfire" with former Lyric Street Records artist Kevin Denney, as well as Mike Rogers and Tom Botkin. Released in May as the third single, it debuted at number 55 on the chart week of June 6, 2009. The song would go on to become Morgan's third top 5 hit, peaking at number 4.

Reception

Stephen Thomas Erlewine, reviewing the album for Allmusic, gave it three stars out of five. He said that the production and lyrics were largely uninspired, and that most of the songs were mid-tempo in nature, but added that Morgan's "cured country croon" kept the material from sounding too much like pop music. Jessica Phillips of Country Standard Time gave a more favorable review. Although she said that his lyrics tended towards commonplace country topics such as "patriotism, family, southern pride, faith, and love", she said that the songs were "simple but profoundly observant" and that Morgan's voice recalled Randy Travis. Phillips cited "Lookin' Back with You" as one of the strongest lyrics that Morgan had written, and noted his "almost-power ballad" performance on "Love Remembers". USA Today gave the album two and a half stars and wrote, "Everyday life makes for tricky subject matter -- the best songs come alive when he gets the details just right; otherwise, they just rhyme."

Track listing

Personnel
Eddie Bayers- drums
Jim "Moose" Brown- clavinet, organ, piano
Melodie Crittenden- background vocals
Eric Darken- percussion
Shannon Forrest- drums
Kevin "Swine" Grantt- bass guitar
Alexandra Greer- background vocals
Vicki Hampton- background vocals
Kirk "Jelly Roll" Johnson- harmonica
Mike Johnson- dobro, steel guitar
Charlie Judge- piano
Jeff King- electric guitar
Andy Leftwich- fiddle, mandolin
Craig Morgan- lead vocals
Phil O'Donnell- electric guitar, background vocals
Angela Primm- background vocals
Russell Terrell- choir arrangements, background vocals
John Willis- banjo, acoustic guitar

Chart performance

Album

Singles

References

2008 albums
Craig Morgan albums
BNA Records albums
Cracker Barrel albums